Didauli is a village in Amawan block of Rae Bareli district, Uttar Pradesh, India. It is located 8 km from Raebareli, the district headquarters. As of 2011, its population is 1,709, in 329 households. It has one primary school and no healthcare facilities.

The 1961 census recorded Didauli (as "Dindauli") as comprising 3 hamlets, with a total population of 631 people (329 male and 302 female), in 128 households and 112 physical houses. The area of the village was given as 875 acres.

The 1981 census recorded Didauli (as "Dendauli") as having a population of 948 people, in 160 households, and having an area of 342.38 hectares. The main staple foods were listed as wheat and rice.

References

Villages in Raebareli district